The Missouri Tigers women's volleyball team represents the University of Missouri in the SEC.

Current coaching staff

Dawn Sullivan - Head Coach

History 

Wayne Kreklow was hired by Mizzou in 2000 while he coached for Columbia College, and he assumed the role of head coach in 2005. Also hired in 2000, his wife, Susan serves as director of volleyball.

In the 2013 season, Missouri clinched the Southeastern Conference championship—the university's first in any sport since entering the SEC in 2012—with a perfect regular season, finishing with a 35–1 record after losing in round two of the NCAA Tournament. Senior setter Molly Kreklow went on to be selected by U.S. women's national volleyball team to compete in the NORCECA Women's Volleyball Championship.

See also
List of NCAA Division I women's volleyball programs

References